Fef (also known as Peef) a town in Tambrauw Regency, Southwest Papua, Indonesia. It is the capital of the Tambrauw Regency and the administrative center of the Tambrauw Regency. It had a population of 428 as of 2010 and 966 at the 2020 Census.

Demography

Population
As of the 2010 census, the population of Fef was 428.

Climate
Fef has a tropical rainforest climate (Af) with heavy to very heavy rainfall year-round.

References

Populated places in Southwest Papua
Regency seats of Southwest Papua
Populated places in Tambrauw

Southwest Papua